The Brian Clough Trophy is contested whenever East Midlands rivals Derby County and Nottingham Forest play each other (known as the East Midlands derby). The trophy is named after Brian Clough, who managed both clubs to great success.  The trophy is currently held by Nottingham Forest.

Background and history

Derby County and Nottingham Forest, football clubs located less than 20 miles apart, have long been arch rivals.  Unusually, the same man managed both clubs during their greatest periods of success: Brian Clough. He managed Derby County from 1967 to 1973, a time in which they won their first Football League title, and Nottingham Forest from 1975 to 1993, during which they won their only Football League title and two European Cups. On both occasions, he lifted the club from Football League Second Division to the First Division title. In doing so, Clough was only the second manager, after Herbert Chapman, to win the Football League with two different clubs.

Clough himself retired from football in 1993 and died in 2004. In early 2007, officials from Derby County, Nottingham Forest and the Brian Clough Memorial Fund, along with Brian Clough's widow Barbara and his son Nigel, agreed to institute an official tournament between the two clubs that Clough was most successful with as a manager. In a further twist in 2009, Nigel Clough himself became manager of Derby County, having previously played with distinction under his father at Nottingham Forest.

The competition does not regularly demand its own fixture, but is competed for whenever the two clubs happen to meet. The first match, however, was a specially-arranged pre-season friendly, with all proceeds going to charity. That initial game was won by Derby County. For the full history behind the trophy matches – including photos of various matches – there is the official Brian Clough tribute website.

One year after that initial Derby friendly win, the two clubs found themselves in the Football League Championship, where they both would remain for 14 consecutive seasons. As well as these 28 league meetings the clubs were also drawn together in the 2008/09 FA Cup 4th Round, which after a replay meant that the trophy has been contested in 2 FA Cup Fixtures. The trophy been contested in a League Cup fixture once, in the 2019/20 season.

Unless they are drawn against each other in one of the cups, the 2022/23 season will be the first where the trophy hasn't been contested since its inception, as Nottingham Forest will compete in the Premier League, while Derby find themselves in League 1.

The trophy itself is a silver loving cup with a lid. The cup is over 100 years old, though it had never been used before becoming the Brian Clough Trophy.

Winners
As of 20 February 2023, Derby County have held the trophy for the longest combined time at 3,199 days. Current holders Nottingham Forest have held the trophy for a combined 2,473 days.

Overview

As of 31  .

Results

2007–08 season
Friendly

2008–09 season

2008–09 Football League Championship

2008–09 FA Cup, Fourth Round

2008–09 FA Cup, Fourth Round Replay

2008–09 Football League Championship

2009–10 season

2009–10 Football League Championship

2009–10 Football League Championship

2010–11 season

2010–11 Football League Championship

2010–11 Football League Championship

2011–12 season

2011–12 Football League Championship

2011–12 Football League Championship

2011–12 Football League Championship

2012–13 season

2012–13 Football League Championship

2012–13 Football League Championship

2013–14 season

2013–14 Football League Championship

2013–14 Football League Championship

2014–15 season

2014–15 Football League Championship

2014–15 Football League Championship

2015–16 season

2015–16 Football League Championship

2015–16 Football League Championship

2016–17 season

2016–17 EFL Championship

2016–17 EFL Championship

2017–18 season

2017–18 EFL Championship

2017–18 EFL Championship

2018–19 season

2018–19 EFL Championship

2018–19 EFL Championship

2019–20 season

2019–20 EFL Cup

2019–20 EFL Championship

2019–20 EFL Championship

2020–21 season

2020-21 EFL Championship

2020-21 EFL Championship

2021-22 Season

2021-22 EFL Championship

2021-22 EFL Championship

References

English football trophies and awards
Football competitions in England
Derby County F.C.
Nottingham Forest F.C.
Awards established in 2007
Brian Clough